A COMMIT statement in SQL ends a transaction within a relational database management system (RDBMS) and makes all changes visible to other users. The general format is to issue a BEGIN WORK statement, one or more SQL statements, and then the COMMIT statement. A COMMIT statement will also release any existing savepoints that may be in use. This means that once a COMMIT statement is issued, you can not rollback the transaction.

In terms of transactions, the opposite of commit is to discard the tentative changes of a transaction, a rollback.

The transaction, commit and rollback concepts are key to the ACID property of databases.

See also
 Commit (data management)
 Atomic commit
 Two-phase commit protocol
 Three-phase commit protocol

References

Data management
SQL
Transaction processing
Relational database management systems